Polypterus palmas, the shortfin or marbled bichir, is a fish in the family Polypteridae found in freshwater environments within a demersal depth range in tropical climates.

Distribution
This species is found in Africa within the Cavally River basin in Côte d'Ivoire, the river basins of eastern Liberia, the St. John River, the upper Casamance River in Senegal, and the Saint Paul River in western Liberia.

Description
It grows to 30.0 cm. The maximum recorded length of P. palmas as an unsexed male is about 35.3 cm (13.9) inches. It is recorded to be a carnivore. P. palmas is commonly identified by its prominent upper jaw that is longer than its lower jaw. The color of this species ranges from light to dark gray. The body also has blotches of darker color.

Common names
Its common names include shortfin bichir, marbled bichir, or dinosaur eel due to its lungfish-like appearance which was described as more primitive and prehistoric than other modern fishes, though it only resembles eels.

References

Polypteridae
Taxa named by William Orville Ayres
Fish described in 1850